James Calvert (3 January 1813 – 8 March 1892), was a Methodist missionary.

James Calvert was a native of Pickering, in the North Riding of Yorkshire. He was sent out in 1838, in company with John Hunt, to work as a missionary in Fiji. From 1837 Fijian chiefs had regarded missionaries as a threat to their authority. He remained for 18 years, during which time he witnessed a successful advance of Christianity.

In his work with the Fijians Calvart was supported by his wife, Mary Fowler Calvert. Through Calvert's ministry the Fijian King Seru Epenisa Cakobau was converted to Christianity, renounced polygamy, and for many years after lived a consistent life. His last act as a king was to cede Fiji to the United Kingdom.

In 1856 Calvert returned to England, and during his stay in the country superintended the printing of the Bible in the Fijian language. In 1872 he was sent out by the Wesleyan Missionary Society to South Africa. He died at Hastings, England, in 1892 aged 79.  In that year he founded a Wesleyan chapel in Hastings; after his death it was named the Calvert Memorial Chapel.

References

1813 births
1892 deaths
19th-century Methodists
English Methodist missionaries
People from Pickering, North Yorkshire
Methodist missionaries in Fiji
British expatriates in Fiji